This article displays the squads for the 2015 World Women's Handball Championship. Each team consists of up to 28 players, of whom 16 may be fielded for each match.

Age, club, caps and goals as of 5 December 2015.

Group A

Denmark
A 19-player squad was announced on 9 November 2015. On 21 November 2015, Simone Böhme replaced Anne Mette Pedersen due to a small injury, while Pedersen maybe ready for the tournament. On 25 November 2015, the squad was reduced to 17 players. On 29 November 2015, the squad was reduced to 15 players, leaving one spot open. Pedersen was added back on 5 December 2015. On 7 December, Lotte Grigel had to withdraw because of a serious injury, and Anna Sophie Okkels was announced as her replacement. On 17 December, Mette Iversen Sahlholdt replaced Anna Sophie Okkels due to a minor injury on Sandra Toft.

Head coach: Klavs Bruun Jørgensen

Hungary
A 19-player squad was announced on 23 November 2015. It was reduced to 18 on 2 December 2015. The final squad was revealed on 5 December 2015.

Head coach: András Németh

Japan
An 18-player squad was announced on 26 November 2015.

Head coach: Masamichi Kuriyama

Montenegro
A 17-player squad was announced on 16 November 2015.

Head coach: Dragan Adžić

Serbia
A 17-player squad was announced on 19 November 2015.

Head coach: Saša Bošković

Tunisia
A first 18-player squad, without players from the European leagues, was announced on 17 November 2015. The full 18-player squad was revealed on 22 November 2015. The final squad was announced on 4 December 2015.

Head coach: Mehrez Ben Ammar

Group B

Angola
An 18-player squad was announced on 5 November 2015.

Head coach: João Florêncio

China
Head coach: Yang Chao

Cuba
Head coach: Jover Hernández

Netherlands
A 20-player squad was announced on 23 October 2015. The final squad was announced on 29 November 2015.

Head coach: Henk Groener

Poland
A 19-player squad was announced on 10 November 2015. The final squad was revealed on 30 November 2015.

Head coach: Kim Rasmussen

Sweden
The squad was announced on 3 November 2015. On 24 November 2015, Edijana Dafe pulled out of the tournament due to pregnancy. On 3 December Marie Wall was officially announced as her replacement in the squad.

Head coach: Tomas Sivertsson

Group C

Argentina
An 18-player squad was announced on 12 November 2015.

Head coach: Eduardo Peruchena

Brazil
The squad was announced on 13 November 2015.

Head coach: Morten Soubak

DR Congo
Head coach: Celestin Mpoua

France
An 18-player squad was announced on 13 November 2015, which was renewed on 3 December 2015.

Head coach: Alain Portes

Germany
A 19-player roster was announced on 11 November 2015. The squad was reduced to 18 on 25 November 2015.

Head coach: Jakob Vestergaard

South Korea
Head coach: Lim Young-chul

Group D

Kazakhstan
Head coach: Yoon Tae-il

Norway
The squad was announced on 8 November 2015. On 16 December Ida Alstad replaced Vilde Ingstad, due to a minor injury on Mari Molids knee.

Head coach: Thorir Hergeirsson

Puerto Rico
Head coach: Camilo Estévez

Romania
A 17-player squad was announced on 13 November 2015.

Head coach: Tomas Ryde

Russia
A 20-player squad was announced on 12 November 2015. The squad was reduced to 18 on 25 November 2015.

Head coach: Yevgeni Trefilov

Spain
An 18-player squad was announced on 12 November 2015. The final squad was announced on 1 December 2015.

Head coach: Jorge Dueñas

References

External links
IHF.info

World Handball Championship squads
2015 in handball